César de la Hoz López (born 30 March 1992) is a Spanish footballer who plays for UD Almería mainly as a midfielder.

Club career
Born in Orejo, Marina de Cudeyo, Cantabria, De la Hoz was a product of Racing de Santander's youth system, and made his senior debut with the reserves in the 2011–12 season, in Tercera División. On 19 August 2012 he made his professional debut, starting in a 0–1 home defeat against UD Las Palmas, in the Segunda División championship.

On 13 July 2013, De la Hoz joined Barakaldo CF in Segunda División B. After appearing regularly he moved to fellow league team Real Betis B on 10 July 2014.

On 30 August 2017, De la Hoz was loaned to Albacete Balompié in the second division, for one year. He scored his first professional goals on 15 October, netting a brace in a 2–1 home defeat of Sevilla Atlético.

On 4 July 2018, De la Hoz signed a two-year deal with UD Almería, still in the second tier.

References

External links

Beticopedia profile 

1992 births
Living people
People from Trasmiera
Spanish footballers
Footballers from Cantabria
Association football midfielders
Segunda División players
Segunda División B players
Tercera División players
Rayo Cantabria players
Racing de Santander players
Barakaldo CF footballers
Betis Deportivo Balompié footballers
Albacete Balompié players
UD Almería players
20th-century Spanish people
21st-century Spanish people